The 2010 Nevada gubernatorial election was held on Tuesday, November 2, 2010, to elect the Governor of Nevada, who would serve a four-year term to begin on January 3, 2011. Sandoval defeated the Democratic nominee Rory Reid, son of then-current U.S. Senate Majority Leader Harry Reid, who won his fifth term in the Senate on the same ballot.

Despite speculation that incumbent Republican Governor Jim Gibbons would not run for a second term due to low approval ratings, he ran for re-election. He struggled in the polls, and ultimately federal judge and former Attorney General of Nevada Brian Sandoval secured the nomination.

Republican primary

Candidates
A total of five Republican candidates filed with the Secretary of State of Nevada and qualified for the ballot.

Declared
 Tony Atwood
 Jim Gibbons, incumbent Governor
 Stan Lusak, perennial candidate
 Mike Montandon, Mayor of North Las Vegas
 Brian Sandoval, former judge of the United States District Court for the District of Nevada and former Nevada Attorney General

Withdrew
 Joe Heck, former State Senator (ran for NV-03 and won)

Polling

Results

Democratic primary

Candidates
Two Democratic candidates filed with the Secretary of State of Nevada and qualified for the ballot.

Declared
 Frederick Conquest, anthropology professor
 Rory Reid, Clark County Commissioner and son of Senate Majority Leader Harry Reid

Declined
 Barbara Buckley, Speaker of the Nevada Assembly

Polling

Results

Other candidates

Independents

Declared
 Eugene "Gino" DiSimone
 Aaron Y. Honig

Declined
 Oscar Goodman, Mayor of Las Vegas

Green
 David Scott Curtis

Independent American
 Floyd Fitzgibbons

Libertarian
 Arthur Forest Lampitt

General election

Predictions

Polling

With Gibbons

With Montandon

Results

See also
2010 United States gubernatorial elections

References

External links
Nevada Secretary of State – Election Center
Nevada Governor Candidates at Project Vote Smart
Campaign contributions for 2010 Nevada Governor from Follow the Money
Nevada Governor 2010 from OurCampaigns.com
2010 Nevada Gubernatorial General Election: All Head-to-Head Matchups graph of multiple polls from Pollster.com
Election 2010: Nevada Governor from Rasmussen Reports
2010 Nevada Governor Race from Real Clear Politics
2010 Nevada Governor's Race from CQ Politics
Race Profile in The New York Times
Election 2010 from Vegas PBS
Debate
Nevada Governor Debate, C-SPAN, August 29, 2010 (57:49)
Nevada Governor Debate, C-SPAN, October 7, 2010 (58:42)

Gubernatorial
2010
Nevada